Jefferson, Pennsylvania may refer to:
Jefferson Hills, Pennsylvania, formerly known as Jefferson
Jefferson, Greene County, Pennsylvania
Jefferson, York County, Pennsylvania
Jefferson County, Pennsylvania

See also
Jefferson Township, Pennsylvania (disambiguation)